Maksim Nedev (born 9 February 1983) is a Bulgarian football player, currently playing for Shumen 2010 as a defender.

References

1983 births
Living people
Bulgarian footballers
First Professional Football League (Bulgaria) players
FC Chernomorets Burgas players
PFC Nesebar players
PFC Svetkavitsa players

Association football defenders